Tone Wilhelmsen Trøen (born 23 February 1966) is a Norwegian politician from the Conservative Party who is a member of the Storting for Akershus since 2013 and served as the President of the Storting from 2018 to 2021.

Personal life
She is married to Ove Trøen, together they have one son.

Political career

Parliament
First elected from Akershus in 2013, she was a member of the Standing Committee on Health and Care Services in her first term as member of parliament. Trøen was reelected in 2017 and appointed to the Election Committee and also as chair of the Standing Committee on Family and Cultural Affairs.

After the Solberg cabinet's defeat in the 2021 election, Trøen became the chair of the Standing Committee on Health and Care Services.

President of the Storting
Following Olemic Thommessen's resignation as President of the Storting, she became the Conservative Party's candidate to replace him as President on 14 March 2018. She was formally elected as the day after.
She is the second woman to have served as President of the Storting, the first being Kirsti Kolle Grøndahl of the Labour Party, who served from 1993 until 2001.

In March 2021, the Storting was the victim of a cyber attack. Trøen called it "an attack on our democracy" and noted that the attack had the potential to disturb parliamentary processes.

In September, after several media revelations of MPs misusing parliamentary commuter homes and the severance pay scheme, Trøen announced that the Storting presidency would be looking into the matter. A revelation of the former later lead to the resignation of minister of children and families Kjell Ingolf Ropstad. A few days later, it was also revealed that Trøen herself also had misused her parliamentary commuter home by allowing her son to utilise it as a student dormitory. She argued that nothing in the rules prohibited the home for such usage.

References 

Conservative Party (Norway) politicians
Presidents of the Storting
Members of the Storting
Akershus politicians
1966 births
Living people
Place of birth missing (living people)
21st-century Norwegian politicians